Out 'N' About is a southern Oregon company that operates treehouse bed and breakfasts and assists with the construction of treehouses.  It is located about  Southeast of Cave Junction, Oregon,

Treehouse Treesort
Out 'N' About Treehouse Treesort is located in the unincorporated community of Takilma, Oregon that hosts a multi-treehouse bed and breakfast run by Michael Garnier. Garnier limbs, developed by Michael Garnier and used to support all of Out 'N' About's tree houses, are one-and-a-half-inch-thick bolts surrounded by a cuff, both made of Grade 5 steel, and able to support .

The treesort has nine treehouses, three with bathrooms.

The Swiss Family complex has parent and child treehouses, connected by swinging bridge. The Cavaltree Fort is two stories tall, with a living unit below, and an observation deck above.  The Peacock Perch has only , and visitors must use a chamber pot or descend 26 feet to use the communal bathroom.

Legal battle
Garnier had to fight the government for almost ten years before gaining the right to house guests in his nine treehouses.  Josephine County building inspectors didn't believe that it was structurally sound, so Garnier gathered 66 people, two dogs and a cat (collectively weighing 10,847 pounds) in a single treehouse.  Despite this, the county demanded that he tear the treehouses down.  He ignored them, and when they objected to him charging money to stay in the treehouses, Garnier then allowed visitors to stay for free, with the requirement that they buy a $75 T-shirt first.  The resulting legal battle lasted ten years, with Garnier attaching a steel cable zip line to his bedroom window in case of the need for a midnight escape.  In 2001, the county relented and granted Garnier his building permits.

References

External links
Out'n'About Treehouse Resort at realtravel.com

Companies based in Cave Junction, Oregon
Hospitality companies established in 1990
Privately held companies based in Oregon
1990 establishments in Oregon